Ashville is a neighborhood of Louisville, Kentucky centered along Bardstown Road (US 31E) and Brentlinger Lane. It is located near the Gene Snyder Freeway.

References
  

Neighborhoods in Louisville, Kentucky